Amanita arctica is a species of Amanita found in Greenland and Norway.

References

External links

arctica
Fungi of Europe
Fungi described in 1987